Gällivare Lapland Airport  is an airport located in Gällivare Municipality, Sweden, about  east from Gällivare and about  from Malmberget. The airport has since 2009 been expanded in a project co-financed by the county council and the EU, the airport was also re-branded.

History
The airport was originally a military airfield with three  airstrips called Kavaheden, built during World War II. The sole surviving airstrip was later extended to  before being opened to regular civilian flights on 19 April 1971. The airstrip was gradually extended to its current length between 1984 and 1994. The airport is one of six airports within Swedish Lapland.

Airlines and destinations

From the bankruptcy of Nextjet on 18 May 2018 until 14 September 2018, there were no regular passenger flights serving Gällivare Lapland Airport. During that period Kiruna Airport operated flight transfer buses to Gällivare. A new operator called LOT Polish Airlines, started operations on the Gällivare – Arvidsjaur – Stockholm route under a new PSO contract on 15 September 2018.

Statistics

Ground transportation 
There is a taxi stand as well as short-term and long-term parking lots at the airport.

See also 
List of the largest airports in the Nordic countries

References

External links 
 

Airports in Sweden
Airports in the Arctic
Airport